Fritz Dietrich (Lavarone, August 6, 1898 – Landsberg am Lech, October 22, 1948) was a German SS officer and member of the Nazi Party. He held a doctoral degree in chemistry and physics. His name is also seen as Emil Dietrich. He was hanged for war crimes.

Career summary 
In 1941 Dietrich held the rank of SS-Lieutenant colonel (Obersturmbannführer). From September 1941 to November 1943 he served as the local SS and police chief in Liepāja (Libau in German), Latvia. Police units under his command carried out a number of massacres of civilians in Liepāja, for the most part of Jewish ethnicity. The largest of the Liepāja massacres took place over three days from December 15 to December 17, 1941. On December 13, the newspaper Kurzemes Vārds published an order by Dietrich which required all Jews in the city to remain in their residences on Monday, December 15 and December 16, 1941, thus facilitating the killing operations.

War crimes trial 
After World War II, Dietrich was put on trial war crimes, but not for his actions in Latvia. Dietrich was instead tried by an American military court for ordering the executions of seven American POWs who had parachuted from disabled airplanes. He was found guilty and sentenced to death. In 1948, Dietrich was hanged at Landsberg Prison, coincidentally the same prison where Hitler had been incarcerated for his involvement in the Beer Hall Putsch of 1923. The trials of Dietrich and others were known as the "Flyers Cases" and were part of what has since become known as the Dachau Trials for war crimes.

Notes

References 
 

1898 births
1948 deaths
People from Trentino
People from the County of Tyrol
Executed Austrian Nazis
SS-Obersturmbannführer
Holocaust perpetrators in Latvia
People of Reichskommissariat Ostland
Dachau trials executions
Executed mass murderers